Orton Hall may refer to:

 University, Hayes and Orton Halls, at The Ohio State University in the United States

See also

 Orton on the Hill, in Leicestershire, England